Azaserine is a naturally occurring serine derivative diazo compound with antineoplastic and antibiotic properties deriving from its action as a purinergic antagonist and structural similarity to glutamine.  Azaserine acts by competitively inhibiting glutamine amidotransferase, a key enzyme responsible for glutamine metabolism.

Mechanism of Action 

Azaserine inhibits the rate limiting step of the metabolic hexosamine pathway and irreversibly inhibits γ-glutamyltransferase by acting directly at the substrate-binding pocket. Independent of hexosamine pathway inhibition, azaserine has been demonstrated to protect against hyperglycemic endothelial damage by elevating serum concentrations of manganese-superoxide dismutase, directly reducing the concentration of reactive oxygen species.

Azaserine also downregulates the expression of VCAM-1 and ICAM-1 in response to TNF-α, and research indicates that it may have potential in identifying the L-leucine-favoring system transporter in human T-lymphocytes.

Properties
Azaserine has a solubility of 50 mg/mL in water, a melting point of 146-162 °C, a vapor pressure of 1.53x10−10mmHg at 25 °C, and decomposes before melting.

References 

 
 
 
 
 

Antineoplastic drugs
Diazo compounds